The Manchester Theatre Awards were established in 2011 to replace the Manchester Evening News Theatre Awards.The MEN awards, created in 1981 by Alan Hulme, the paper's theatre critic, had long been recognised as the most important theatrical prize-giving outside London and were an important part of the Greater Manchester theatrical calendar. When the Manchester Evening News withdrew its support, the critics already involved,  led by Alan Hulme and his MEN successor Kevin Bourke, and with the support of the Greater Manchester theatres, set up a new organisation to carry on the awards. The first winners, for 2011, were announced on 14 March 2012.

Winners and nominations

2017
Winners of the 2017 awards were announced on 9 March 2018 at The Lowry
 Actor In A Leading Role: Kenneth Alan Taylor, The Father, Oldham Coliseum
 Actress In A Leading Role: Janet Suzman, Rose, HOME (Manchester)
 Actor In A Supporting Role: Andrew Sheridan, People, Places & Things, HOME (Manchester) 
 Actress In A Supporting Role:  Katie West, Uncle Vanya, HOME (Manchester) 
 Actor in a Visiting Production: Danny Mac, Sunset Boulevard, Palace Theatre
 Actress in a Visiting Production:  Sheridan Smith, Funny Girl, Palace Theatre
 Performance in a Studio Production:  Rhodri Meillir, How My Light Is Spent, Royal Exchange Studio
 Performance in a Fringe Production:  Alexandra Maxwell, The Loves Of Others/Freaks, Greater Manchester Fringe
 Ensemble:  The Suppliant Women, Royal Exchange 
 Production: The Father, Oldham Coliseum
 Visiting Production: The Weir, Oldham Coilseum
 Studio Production:  Man On The Moon, Contact Theatre
 Fringe Production:  Moth, Hope Mill Theatre
 Musical: Sunset Boulevard, 
 Dance:  English National Ballet double bill, Palace Theatre
 Opera:  The Snow Maiden, Opera North, The Lowry
 Design: Jenny Melville (set) and Lysander Ashton (video), Paul Auster’s  City of Glass, HOME 
 New Play:  Narcissist In The Mirror, Rosie Fleeshman, Greater Manchester Fringe', 
 Special Entertainment:  Dick Whittington, The Palace 
 Youth Panel Award: Singin’ in the Rain, RNCM Young Company
 Newcomer: Scott Hunter, Yank!, Hope Mill Theatre

2016
Winners of the 2016 awards were announced on 17 March 2017 at HOME (Manchester)
 Actor In A Leading Role: Daniel Rigby, Breaking the Code, Royal Exchange, Manchester
 Actress In A Leading Role: Julie Hesmondhalgh, Wit, Royal Exchange, Manchester
 Actor In A Supporting Role: Daniel Crossley, Sweet Charity, Royal Exchange, Manchester
 Actress In A Supporting Role:  Natalie Dew, Breaking the Code, Royal Exchange, Manchester 
 Actor in a Visiting Production: Rufus Hound, Wind in the Willows, The Lowry
 Actress in a Visiting Production:  Aiofe Duffin, A Girl is a Half-formed Thing, The Lowry 
 Actor in a Studio Production:  Joseph Quinn, Wish List, Royal Exchange Studio
 Actress in a Studio Production:  Erin Doherty,  Wish List, Royal Exchange Studio
 Performance in a Fringe Production:  Joyce Branagh, Boomtown Gals 
 Ensemble:  Singin’ in the Rain, Octagon Theatre, Bolton
 Production: Breaking the Code, Royal Exchange, Manchester
 Visiting Production: The James Plays, The Lowry 
 Studio Production:  Wish List, Royal Exchange Studio 
 Fringe Production:  The Trial, Hope Mill Theatre
 Musical: Sweet Charity, Royal Exchange, Manchester
 Dance:  Akram Khan’s Giselle, Palace Theatre
 Opera:  Andrea Chenier, Opera North, The Lowry
 Design: Singin’ in the Rain, Ocatagon Theatre 
 New Play:  The Emperor, HOME (Manchester)
 Special Entertainment:  The Peony Pavilion, The Lowry
 Youth Panel Award: Nothing, Royal Exchange Theatre Young Company
Special Achievement Award: Joseph Houston and William Whelton, founders of Hope Mill Theatre Philip Radcliffe, critic and founder member of the Manchester Theatre Awards
 Stage Door Award For Excellence: Take Back Theatre Collective
 Best newcomer: Norah Lopez Holden for Ghosts, Home
 Best young newcomers: Samuel Torpey, Henry Harmer and Elliot Stiff for Billy Elliot. Jasmine de Goede and Lucy Doyle Ryder for To Kill a Mockingbird

2015
Winners of the 2015 awards were announced on 4 March 2016 at HOME (Manchester)
 Actor In A Leading Role: Colin Connor, A View From The Bridge, Octagon Theatre, Bolton. Nominations: Rob Edwards, Jonjo O’Neill and Sam Swann
 Actress In A Leading Role: Barbara Drennan, A View From The Bridge, Octagon Theatre, Bolton. Nominations: Scarlett Brookes, Kathryn Hunter and Maxine Peake
 Actress In A Supporting Role: Natasha Davidson, A View From The Bridge, Octagon Theatre, Bolton. Nominations: Lauren Drummond, Anna Wheatley, Ria Zmitrowicz
 Actor in a Visiting Production: Joe Armstrong, Constellations, The Lowry. Nominations: Michael Ball, Finetime Fontayne, Dominic Marsh
 Actress in a Visiting Production: Louise Brealey, Constellations, The Lowry. Nominations:Debbie Kurup, Lucy O’Byrne, Sophie Thompson 
 Performance in a Studio Production:  Carla Langley, Cuddles, Royal Exchange Studio. Nominations: Alex Austin, Carla Langley, Sian Reese-Williams Abdul Salis 
 Performance in a Fringe Production: Colin Connor, Mr Smith, Kings Arms, Salford. Nominations: Ben Bland, Heather Carroll, Jeni Howarth-Williams 
 Ensemble: Noises Off (Ocagon Theatre). Nominations: Dreamers (Oldham Coliseum), Lord of the Flies (The Lowry), Street Scene (RNCM)
 Production: An Enemy of the People, David Thacker, Octagon Theatre, Bolton. Nominations: Educating Rita (Oldham Coliseum), Rite (Contact), A View From The Bridge (Octagon Theatre)
 Visiting Production: Constellations from The Royal Court, The Lowry. Nominations: Beryl,   John, Twelve Angry Men 
 Studio Production:  Lungs, The Roundabout at The Lowry. Nominations: Cuddles, Light,  So Here We Are 
 Fringe Production:  The Rise and Fall of Little Voice at the Kings Arms, Salford. Nominations: Mr. Smith at the Kings Arms, Salford, Parents Without Children at the Three Minute Theatre, We Are The Multitude at 24:7 Theatre Festival
 Musical:  The Bodyguard - The Musical, Palace Theatre. Nominations: Anything Goes, Guys And Dolls, Mack & Mabel
 Dance: Lest We Forget, English National Ballet, Palace Theatre: Nominations:  1984, Flex’N Manchester, Tree Of Codes
 Opera:  A Midsummer Night's Dream, Royal Northern College of Music. Nominations: Cosi Fan Tutte, Giovanna d’Arco, The Marriage of Figaro
 Design: Tree Of Codes at the Opera House. Nominations:  Inkheart, Moominland Midwinter, The Oresteia, 
 New Play:  The Rolling Stone (Chris Urch), Royal Exchange, Manchester. Nominations: Beryl (Maxine Peake), Nirbhaya (Yael FarberSo Here We Are (Luke Norris)
 Special Entertainment:  Bridging the Gap, The Gap Theatre Project, Halle St Peters. Nominations: Inala - A Zulu Ballet, Ultima Vez, Bridging the Gap, Moominland Midwinter
 Youth Panel Award: The Shrine of Everyday Things, Contact Young Company at Contact Theatre. Nominations:  On The Town,  TaY Talks, The Wardrobe
 Special Achievement Award: Professor David Thacker
 Stage Door Award For Excellence: 24:7 Theatre Festival

2014
Nominations for 2014 performances were announced on 20 January 2015. The winners were announced and presented on 13 March 2015 at the Royal Northern College of Music

 Best actor: Harry McEntire, Billy Liar, Royal Exchange
 Best actress: Clare Foster, Duet For One and Separation, Bolton Octagon
 Best supporting actor: David Burrell, Journey’s End, Bolton Octagon
 Best supporting actress: Gillian Bevan, Hamlet, Royal Exchange
 Best actor in a visiting production : Sir Anthony Sher, Henry IV, Royal Shakespeare Company at The Lowry
 Best actress in a visiting production : Katherine Kingsley, Dirty Rotten Scoundrels, Manchester Opera House
 Best production – Angel Meadow, Anu Productions for HOME (Manchester)
 Best visiting production: The Curious Incident Of The Dog In The Night-Time, National Theatre at The Lowry
 The Brynteg Award for Best Musical: Jersey Boys, Palace Theatre
 Best opera: Gotterdammerung, Opera North at The Lowry
 The Robert Robson award for dance: Le Corsaire, English National Ballet at The Lowry
 Best design: Romeo and Juliet, HOME (Manchester)
 Best newcomer: Emily Barber, Billy Liar, Royal Exchange
 Best new play: An August Bank Holiday Lark, Northern Broadsides at the Oldham Coliseum Theatre 
 Best studio production: We Had Hairy Hands, The Lowry Studio
 Best fringe production: Thick as Thieves Hard Graft Theatre Company 
 Best studio performance: Sinead Matthews, Pink, Royal Exchange Studio
 Best fringe performance: Kaitlin Howard, The Alphabet Girl
 Best ensemble: Angel Meadow, Anu Productions for HOME (Manchester)
 Best special entertainment: Barry Humphries, Manchester Opera House
 Youth Panel Award: A Midsummer Night’s Dream, Lowry Young Actors Company
 Special achievement award: David Slack
 The Stage Door Foundation award for excellence: Monkeywood Theatre

2013

 Best Actor: Kenneth Branagh, Macbeth, Manchester International Festival
 Best Actress: Cush Jumbo, A Doll's House, Royal Exchange 
 Best Supporting Actor: Ray Fearon, Macbeth, Manchester International Festival
 Best Supporting Actress: Shirley Darroch, Chicago, Oldham Coliseum
 Best Actor in a Visiting Production: Julian Glover, Maurice's Jubilee, Opera House
 Best Actress in a Visiting Production: Catherine Kinsella, Rutherford and Son, The Lowry
 Best Production: Macbeth, Manchester International Festival
 Best Visiting Production: War Horse, National Theatre at The Lowry
 Best Musical: Singin' In The Rain, Opera House
 Best opera: Otello, Opera North, The Lowry
 The Robert Robson award for dance: Michael Clark Triple Bill, The Lowry
 Best Design: The Old Woman, Manchester International Festival, Palace Theatre
 Best Newcomer: Freya Sutton, Hairspray, The Lowry
 Best New Play: Away From Home, 24:7 Theatre Festival
 Best Studio Production: Brilliant Adventures, Royal Exchange Studio
 Best Fringe Production: The Best, Lass O'Gowrie
 Best Studio Performance: Robert Lonsdale, Brilliant Adventures, Royal Exchange Studio
 Best Fringe Performance: Rob Ward, Away From Home, 24:7 Theatre Festival
 Best Ensemble: Chicago, Oldham Coliseum
 Best Special Entertainment: Dick Whittington, Opera House
 Special Achievement Award - Chris Honer, Library Theatre, Manchester
 The Stage Door Foundation award for excellence: Lip Service

2012

 Best Production: Wonderful Town, directed by Braham Murray for the Royal Exchange at The Lowry
 Best Studio Production: Black Roses, Royal Exchange Studio
 Best New Play: Snookered by Ishy Din, Oldham Coliseum
 Best Visiting Production: Julius Caesar, Royal Shakespeare Company at The Lowry
 Best Fringe: All The Bens by Ian Townsend, 24:7 Theatre Festival
 Best Special Entertainment: Star Cross'd, Oldham Coliseum
 Best Design: Wonderful Town for the Royal Exchange at The Lowry
 Best Opera: Don Giovanni, Opera North, The Lowry
 Best Actress in a Visiting Production: Siân Phillips, Cabaret, The Lowry
 Best Actor in a Visiting Production: Ray Fearon, Julius Caesar, Royal Shakespeare Company at The Lowry
 Best Actor: Christopher Ravenscroft, The Winslow Boy, Bolton Octagon
 Best Actress: Maxine Peake, Miss Julie, Royal Exchange
 Best Performance in a Studio Production: Julie Hesmondhalgh, Black Roses, Royal Exchange Studio
 Best Supporting Actor: Christopher Villiers, The Winslow Boy, Bolton Octagon
 Best Supporting Actress: Natalie Grady, The Daughter-in-Law, the Library Theatre
 Best Newcomer: Tamla Kari, Saturday Night and Sunday Morning, Royal Exchange
 Best Ensemble: Arabian Nights, the Library Theatre
 Best Musical: The Lion King, Palace Theatre
 Best Dance: Matthew Bourne’s Sleeping Beauty, The Lowry
 Special Award: Porl Cooper

2011

 Best Production: The Price, directed by David Thacker for Bolton Octagon
 Best Actor: Con O'Neill, A View From The Bridge, Royal Exchange
 Best Actress: Margot Leicester, Who's Afraid Of Virginia Woolf?, Bolton Octagon
 Best Actor in a Supporting Role: Kenneth Alan Taylor, The Price, Bolton Octagon
 Best Actress in a Supporting Role: Shannon Tarbet, Mogadishu, Royal Exchange
 Best New Play: Secret Thoughts by David Lodge, Bolton Octagon
 Best Newcomer: Matthew Tennyson, Beautiful Thing, Royal Exchange
 Best Studio Performance: Matthew Ganley, God Wept And The Devil Laughed, Lowry Studio
 Best of the Fringe: Sherica, Balloon Head and Shred Productions, 24:7 Theatre Festival
 Best Design: Hard Times design Judith Croft; light Nick Richings; sound Peter Rice, Library Theatre at Murrays' Mills
 Best Musical: Ghost the Musical, Manchester Opera House
 Best Visiting Production: One Man, Two Guvnors, National Theatre at The Lowry
 Best Actor in a Visiting Production: Rory Kinnear, Hamlet, National Theatre at The Lowry
 Best Actress in a Visiting Production: Sharon D Clarke, Ghost the Musical Manchester Opera House
 Best Special Entertainment: The Life and Death of Marina Abramović, Manchester International Festival, The Lowry
 Opera: The Portrait, Opera North, The Lowry
 Dance: Cinderella, Birmingham Royal Ballet, The Lowry
 Special Award: For outstanding contribution to North West theatre – Braham Murray

References

British theatre awards
2011 establishments in the United Kingdom
Awards established in 2011